The Dickinson House is a historic house in Grove Hill, Alabama.  The two-story Italianate style house was built in 1845.  It was designed by James Newman.  It was added to the Alabama Register of Landmarks and Heritage on  January 1, 1978, and to the National Register of Historic Places on September 13, 1978.  The house was listed due to its architectural significance as an early example of Italianate architecture.

References

National Register of Historic Places in Clarke County, Alabama
Houses on the National Register of Historic Places in Alabama
Italianate architecture in Alabama
Houses completed in 1845
Properties on the Alabama Register of Landmarks and Heritage
Houses in Clarke County, Alabama